Mouhamadou Bachir Ndiaye (born 27 January 1999) is a Senegalese professional footballer who plays as a midfielder for Charlotte Independence in the USL Championship.

Career

Youth, College & Amateur
Ndiaye was born in Dakar, Senegal. He moved with his family to Jacksonville, North Carolina in 2016, and he played high school soccer at Northside High School in Roanoke County, Virginia, where he earned a 3A All-State distinction.

In 2019, Ndiaye attended Louisburg College to play college soccer. In his lone season with the Hurricanes, Ndiaye made 17 appearances, scoring six goals and tallying three assists, as well as earning a First-Team All-Conference selection. In 2020, Ndiaye transferred to the University of North Carolina Wilmington. He remained with the Seahawks for three seasons, and made 36 appearances. He was an All-Colonial Athletic Association First-Team selection and earned United Soccer Coaches All-Atlantic First Team notice.

While at UNC Wilmington, Ndiaye also appeared in the USL League Two with Asheville City during their 2022 season, where he made six appearances.

On 21 December 2022, Ndiaye was selected 47th overall in the 2023 MLS SuperDraft by Inter Miami CF.

Professional
On 10 March 2023, Ndiaye signed his first professional deal with USL League One side Charlotte Independence. He made his professional debut on 18 March 2023, appearing as a 74th-minute substitute during a 0–0 draw with Richmond Kickers.

References

External links
 Bachir Ndiaye at UNCW Athletics

1999 births
21st-century Senegalese people
Association football midfielders
Charlotte Independence players
Footballers from Dakar
Inter Miami CF draft picks
Living people
Senegalese expatriate footballers
Senegalese expatriate sportspeople
Senegalese footballers
UNC Wilmington Seahawks men's soccer players
USL League One players
USL League Two players
Louisburg Hurricanes men's soccer players